This is the complete list of Asian Winter Games medalists in cross-country skiing from 1986 to 2017.

Men

Sprint
 Freestyle: 2007
 Classical: 2011–

Team sprint
 Freestyle: 2011

10 km
 Classical: 1996–

15 km
 Classical: 1986–1990
 Freestyle: 1996
 Classical: 1999
 Freestyle: 2003–

30 km
 Freestyle: 1986–2007
 Classical: 2011
 Freestyle: 2017–

4 × 7.5 km relay
 From 1986 to 2011, 4 × 10 km relay

Women

Sprint
 Freestyle: 2007
 Classical: 2011–

Team sprint
 Freestyle: 2011

5 km
 Classical: 1986–

10 km
 Freestyle: 1986
 Classical: 1990
 Freestyle: 1996–

15 km
 Freestyle: 1990
 Classical: 2011
 Freestyle: 2017–

4 × 5 km relay

References

External links
 1996 Results
 1999 Results
 2003 Results
 2007 Results
 2011 Results

Cross-country skiing
medalists